Peewee Moke (born January 12, 1986 in Samoa) is a Samoan rugby league footballer who plays as a .

Early years
Moke attended Endeavour Sports High School, and his junior club was the Enfield Federals.

Playing career
Moke has been with the Penrith Panthers, Cronulla Sharks, Canterbury Bulldogs and Sydney Roosters though he never represented any club at first grade level.

International career
While attending Endeavour Sports High School, Moke played for the Australian Schoolboys team in 2005. In 2006 he played for Samoa as they attempted to qualify for the 2008 World Cup.

References

External links
Peewee Moke Sharks Forever Profile

1986 births
Living people
People educated at Endeavour Sports High School
Rugby league centres
Samoan rugby league players
Samoa national rugby league team players
Samoan emigrants to Australia
Sportspeople from Apia